Yazid ibn Hatim al-Muhallabi (died March 13, 787) was a member of the Muhallabid family who served as the governor of Adharbayjan, Egypt (762–769) and Ifriqiya (771–787) for the Abbasid Caliphate.

Yazid was a close associate of the future caliph al-Mansur (reigned 754–775) and was present in the latter's camp during the surrender of Wasit in 750. He was subsequently appointed as governor of Adharbayjan, where he initiated a program to transfer Yemeni Arabs from Basra and settle them in the province. In 755 he was one of the commanders who attempted to put down the Kharijite rebel Mulabbid ibn Harmalah al-Shaybani in the region of Mosul, but he was defeated and forced to withdraw.

In 762 al-Mansur appointed him as the governor of Egypt. He remained in this position until 769, making his eight-year tenure the longest of any governor of the province in the early Abbasid period. As a trusted aide of the caliph, his appointment was intended to secure Abbasid control of Egypt, especially against Alid agitation, which his predecessor, Humayd ibn Qahtaba had ignored. The Alid unrest eventually culminated in the Revolt of Muhammad the Pure Soul in Medina and Basra in 762–763, but Yazid and his sahib al-shurta, Abdallah ibn Abd al-Rahman al-Tujibi, succeeded in thwarting the plans of the Alid party in Egypt from launching a revolt in Fustat as well. In 767, Yazid sent an army into the rebellious Bashmur, but it was defeated and forced to retreat.

Following the death of the governor of Ifriqiya, 'Umar ibn Hafs al-Muhallabi, at the hands of Kharijite rebels in 771, al-Mansur appointed Yazid to that position and dispatched him to the province with a massive army. After arriving in Tripoli, Yazid advanced against the Ibadis in early 772 and engaged them in a major battle, killing their leader Abu Hatim Yaqub ibn Labib al-Khariji and a large number of the rebels. After spending a month hunting down any surviving Ibadis, he proceeded to the provincial capital al-Qayrawan and entered it, and successfully established his rule over the province.

Yazid spent the remainder of his life as governor of Ifriqiya. In contrast to his predecessors, his tenure saw a period of peace and stability for the province; a Kharijite uprising in 773 and a rebellion by the Warfajuma Berbers in the Zab in 781 were both suppressed. During his administration he organized the markets of al-Qayrawan and restored the city mosque.

Yazid died in al-Qayrawan on March 13, 787, after a reign of fifteen years and three months, and was buried near the city gate. Following his death, his son Dawud briefly succeeded him as governor of Ifriqiya, before being replaced with Rawh ibn Hatim al-Muhallabi.

References

Sources 
 
 
 
 
 
 

 
 
 
 

787 deaths
8th-century Abbasid governors of Egypt
Abbasid governors of Egypt
Abbasid governors of Ifriqiya
Muhallabids
Year of birth unknown
8th-century Arabs
8th-century people of Ifriqiya